Rajab Ali Tabrizi (died in 1670) was an Iranian and Shiat philosopher and mystic of the 17th century. He was educated in the Sheikh Lotf Allah school.

Books
1- Resaleh-ye 
2- "Al Osul ol Asfiyeh" or "Asl ol Osul". 
3- "A book in theology". 
4- "The interpretation of Ayatolkorsi"
5- "The divine instructions"
6- His book of poetry

Pupils
Qazi Sa’id Qumi

References 

Islamic philosophers
17th-century Muslim scholars of Islam
Iranian Shia scholars of Islam
1670 deaths
Iranian Muslim mystics
Year of birth unknown
17th-century Iranian philosophers
Writers from Tabriz